Uncle Tom's Cabin is an anti-slavery novel by Harriet Beecher Stowe.

Uncle Tom's Cabin may also refer to:

Film
 Uncle Tom's Cabin (1903 film), an American silent short drama
 Uncle Tom's Cabin (1910 film), an American silent short drama
 Uncle Tom's Cabin (1914 film), an American silent historical drama film
 Uncle Tom's Cabin (1918 film), an American silent drama film
 Uncle Tom's Cabin (1927 film), a silent film  by Harry A. Pollard
 Uncle Tom's Cabin (1965 film), a film by Géza von Radványi
 Uncle Tom's Cabin (1987 film), a television film featuring Avery Brooks

Other uses
 "Uncle Tom's Cabin" (song), a 1990 song by Warrant from Cherry Pie
 Uncle Tom's Cabin Historic Site, an open-air museum and African American history centre near Dresden, Ontario, Canada
 Uncle Tom's Cabin, a pub in Wincanton, Somerset, England
 Uncle Tom's Cabin, a pub in Dundrum, Dublin, Republic of Ireland
 Riley-Bolten House, known locally as Uncle Tom's Cabin

See also
A Key to Uncle Tom's Cabin by Harriet Beecher Stowe
 Film adaptations of Uncle Tom's Cabin
 Onkel Toms Hütte (Berlin U-Bahn), a U-Bahn station
 Tom Shows, stage productions based on Uncle Tom's Cabin
 Uncle Tom, a pejorative term for a black person who is perceived as behaving subserviently to white authority